The Cahora Bassa Dam is located in Mozambique. It is one of two major dams on the Zambezi river, the other being the Kariba. The dam was finished in December 1974 after much political debate. This dam is used to convert the Zambezi River power into electricity by turning turbines. That energy is then sent to South African cities, farms, and mines. The Cahora Bassa dam forms Cahora Bassa Lake. The dam is jointly owned by Mozambique and Portugal. From independence until 2007, eighteen percent of the dam and lake was owned by Mozambique and eighty-two percent by Portugal. Portugal sold down its share to 15 percent in 2007. The Cahora Bassa dam is the largest hydroelectric power plant in southern Africa and the most efficient power generating station in Mozambique.

History

Before the Cahora Bassa dam underwent construction, the native people protested the dam in order to keep their land. Built in the first half of the 1970s when Mozambique was still a Portuguese territory, long stretches of the power transmission lines were sabotaged during 16 years of Mozambican Civil War which ended in 1992. Today, the Portuguese government owns eighty-two percent of the Cahora Bassa Lake and the Cahora Bassa dam while the Mozambique government owns the remaining 18 percent. When given the order to begin construction in 1969, the colonial government of Portugal forced the native people out of their homes and villages in order for the Portuguese and European workers to have a place to live during construction. The Cahora Bassa dam was built in order for more power to go to South Africa. The Portuguese government built a small town for all the contractors, electricians, and engineers on top of the native Mozambique homes. The evicted native people were not given compensation for their loss of property. The dam was built to produce electricity for South African farms, mines, and cities. Since the dam transfers the electricity that it creates to South Africa, it is taking electricity away from the natives that were able to keep some of their land. The natives now struggle for electricity and a regular supply of clean drinking water. Before 2010, the average annual rainfall was thirty-seven inches. This has been decreasing ever since and in 2016, the average annual rainfall was twenty-five inches. If this average continues to fall, the dam operators may have to shut off the flow to some or even all the turbines. Doing so will conserve the water and energy until the reservoir is full enough to allow water to spin the turbines and create more electricity. Having some or all turbines will cause parts of South Africa to lose energy. During the plant shutdown, Songo and Apollo will have a fraction of the energy coming into the converter stations. These places will still be able to use electricity due to the energy that has been stored in a device called an accumulator or by using the pumping method. This method is done by pumping water into a reservoir and letting it go through a turbine when energy is needed..

Power stations
The Cahora Bassa system is the largest hydroelectric scheme in southern Africa with the powerhouse containing five  turbines. Most of the power generated is exported to South Africa, which is done by the Cahora Bassa HVDC system, a set of High voltage direct current lines. The system includes two converter stations, one at Songo in Mozambique and the other at Apollo in South Africa. The amount of water that flows through these turbines makes this dam the largest hydroelectric plant in southern Africa. 1,450 megawatts get generated from the water passing through the five turbines. This power is transferred over 1,800-kilometers (1100 miles) of high voltage direct current lines that run from Songo to the power grids of South Africa. There are two parallel pylons between these two stations, covering 1,400 km, of which 900 km is in Mozambican territory. These HVDC lines work at 533 kV and in Mozambique territory have about 4,200 towers.

Renovation and upgrade
In December 2022, Hidroeléctrica de Cahora Bassa (HCB), the company that operates the Cahora Bassa Hydroelectric Power Station, secured a loan worth US$125 million to rehabilitate and modernize the dam's infrastructure and operating systems. The EPC contactor for the rehabilitation is a consortium comprising Sweco from Sweden and Intertechne Consultores from Brazil. The renovations are expected to keep the power station's generating capacity at 2,075 megawatts, until 2050 at the minimum. Rehabilitation work is expected to conclude in 2025.

See also 

Cahora Bassa HVDC system
Cahora Bassa Lake
List of conventional hydroelectric power stations
 List of crossings of the Zambezi River

References 

Dams in Mozambique
Zambezi River
Buildings and structures in Tete Province
Hydroelectric power stations in Mozambique
Dams completed in 1974
Energy infrastructure completed in 1974
1974 establishments in Mozambique

es:Presa de Cahora Bassa
it:Diga di Cabora Bassa